The American pygmy shrew (Sorex hoyi) is a small shrew found in Northern Alaska, Canada, and the northern United States, south through the Appalachian Mountains. It was first discovered in 1831 by naturalist William Cane in Georgian Bay, Parry Sound.

This animal is found in northern coniferous and deciduous forests of North America. It is believed to be the second-smallest mammal in the world, but has an extremely large appetite for its size. Due to its fast metabolism, it needs to eat constantly. It digs through moist soils and decaying leaf litter for food.

Description 
The American pygmy shrew is the smallest mammal native to North America and is one of the smallest mammals in the world, being just slightly larger than the Etruscan shrew of Eurasia. Its fur is generally a reddish or grayish brown during the summer, and a white-gray color during the winter. The underside is generally a lighter gray. This animal molts about twice a year, once during late summer, and again during the spring. It has a narrow head with a pointed nose, and whiskers. The eyes are small and well hidden. The primary senses used for hunting are hearing and smell.

Phylogeny 
Sorex hoyi was originally placed in the genus Microsorex, which was a subgenus under Sorex until more research had been done. The American pygmy shrew is in the order Soricomorpha and the family Soricidae. Its two closest relatives are the smokey shrew (S. fumes) and the large-toothed shrew (S. macrodon). This genus is believed to have appeared in the late Miocene.

Distribution and habitat 
Pygmy shrews are distributed throughout the boreal areas of North America. This ranges from Northern Alaska, to the Rocky Mountains, through the Great Lakes region, to the Appalachians, to the eastern side of Canada. Although S. hoyi prefers moist habitats, it has been recorded to live in areas with both wet and dry soil, but if it is living in a more arid environment, it needs to have a source of water nearby.

Diet 
Primarily insectivorous, this animal forages in moist soil and dead leaves to find its prey. Because of the pygmy shrew's small size, its diet primarily consists of insects and insect larvae, while the larger shrews eat insects and worms. Its diet is almost exclusively protein-based. To stay alive, the pygmy shrew has to eat three times its body weight daily, which means capturing prey every 15 to 30 minutes, day and night; a full hour without food means certain death. Because of this high metabolism, the pygmy shrew never sleeps more than a few minutes at a time, as it is in a constant search for food. Although due to its small body size it is always losing body heat, being small has its advantages during the winter when food is scarce. Predators of the American pygmy shrew include hawks, brook trout, owls, snakes, and domestic cats.

Lifecycle and reproduction 
Little is known about the reproductive cycle of pygmy shrews. They appear to mate year round, with a bias of births occurring from November through March. The gestation period is estimated to last about 18 days. Females produce a litter of three to eight young, and only give birth once a year. The age the young are weaned is not known with certainty, but by 18 days old, they are nearly full grown, and are usually independent by 25 days. Being mammals, the mother nourishes her young with milk. The maximum lifespan of a pygmy shrew is not known, but it is believed to be about 16–17 months.

Behavior 
Pygmy shrews dig through soil and leaf litter to search for food, and can use tunnel networks created by other animals to aid in that search. They do not sleep or rest for extended periods of times, but alternate between rest and activity all day and night, showing a bias towards nighttime. They have keen senses of smell and hearing to help them find prey. When feeling threatened or scared, the shrews make a sharp squeaking noise and run for cover. Shrews can also swim, which makes them prey to brook trout. Pygmy shrews are in constant motion, and captured shrews have been observed "climbing and walking upside down on the wire top of the cage."

Physiology 
Due to its high metabolism, the pygmy shrew is active year-round and does not engage in any form of torpor. Shrews have been known to burrow through snow to find food, showing that winter snow does not stop them. Although usually a positive correlation exists between latitude and shrew body size, the American pygmy shrew is an exception. Although it is constantly losing body heat because it is so small, it also benefits from this because to generate that energy takes less food than it would for a larger shrew.

References

Sorex
Shrew, American Pygmy
Shrew, Pygmy
Mammals described in 1857
Taxa named by Spencer Fullerton Baird